is a children's television program airing weekday mornings in Japan on NHK. The show consists of seasonal songs, the Galapico Pu segment, and animated shorts like Tomodachi Hachi Nin (previously also Deko Boko Friends).

, the program was hosted by:
 Singer Brother Yuichiro Hanada
 Singer Sister Maya Nagata
 Taisou Brother Makoto Fukuo
 Taisou Sister Azuki Akimoto
 Fantane!

Deko Boko Friends
 is a collection of 30-second Japanese shorts created by advertising creators Momoko Maruyama and Ryotaro Kuwamoto to promote acceptance of people of different personalities and appearances. The shorts are focused on 12 different creatures, meant to show certain personalities, likes, dislikes, and quirks.

Deko Boko Friends originated on NHK's oldest running children's programming show, Okaasan to Issho in 2003, superseding previous short cartoon series, Yancharu Moncha. It was distributed in English by Viz Media and shown in English on Nickelodeon's children's programming block, Nick Jr. and Noggin in the United States, and on Treehouse TV in Canada.

References

External links 
 

Japanese children's television series
1959 Japanese television series debuts
1950s Japanese television series
1960s Japanese television series
1970s Japanese television series
1980s Japanese television series
1990s Japanese television series
2000s Japanese television series
2010s Japanese television series
2020s Japanese television series
NHK original programming